Translanguaging can refer to a pedagogical process of utilizing more than one language within a classroom lesson or it can be used to describe the way bilinguals use their linguistic resources to make sense of and interact with the world around them. The term "translanguaging" was coined in the 1980s by Cen Williams (applied in Welsh as trawsieithu) in his unpublished thesis titled “An Evaluation of Teaching and Learning Methods in the Context of Bilingual Secondary Education.” Williams used the term to describe the practice of using two languages in the same lesson, which differed from many previous methods of bilingual education that tried to separate languages by class, time, or day. In addition, Vogel and Garcia argued that translanguaging theory posits that rather than possessing two or more autonomous language systems, as previously thought when scholars described bilingual or multilingual speakers, bilinguals and multilingual speakers select and deploy their languages from a unitary linguistic repertoire. However, the dissemination of the term, and of the related concept, gained traction decades later due in part to published research by Ofelia García, among others. In this context, translanguaging is an extension of the concept of languaging, the discursive practices of language speakers, but with the additional feature of using multiple languages, often simultaneously. It is a dynamic process in which multilingual speakers navigate complex social and cognitive demands through strategic employment of multiple languages.

Translanguaging involves issues of language production, effective communication, the function of language, and the thought processes behind language use. Translanguaging is a result of bilingualism. The term is often employed in a pedagogical setting, but also has applications to any situation experienced by multilingual speakers, who constitute most language communities in the world. This includes complex linguistic family dynamics, and the use of code-switching and how that usage relates to one's understanding of their own multilingualism.

Translanguaging is an opportunity to allow learners to use what they already have learned in the past from their first language to clarify ideas and concepts of the second language. Students already know the meaning of a word in their first language and only need to learn the word (but not the meaning); therefore, translanguaging can offer the tools to connect all linguistic repertoire and comprehend better. Using multiple languages together allows a more natural process of understanding. Therefore, translanguaging can also be a new way to teach a language where not only a single new language is used, but rather all knowledge is implemented to support learning. Educators can also use translanguaging to compare and contrast the similarities and differences of language to solve the complexity of some words or sounds. Using bilingual texts can also support learners. Students can use resources from all languages they know to help them make sense of the text.

History 

Archeological evidence points to  Bilingual education going back to at least 4000–5000 years. While most modern research about bilingual education focuses on the later 20th century, there is also research that shows Greek and Latin both being learned by Roman Aristocrats. Modern Bilingual education systems emerged across Europe and North America in the 1960s and 1970s such as French Immersion in Canada.

The ideology behind translanguaging emerged from the evolution of multilingual teaching practices, particularly the practices promoted by Teaching English to Speakers of Other Languages (TESOL), an international association designed to advance the quality of English language instruction. The beginnings of bilingual education in the United States asserted the primacy of speech and neglected written language learning. The second language instruction of the 1960s and 70s heavily utilized oral–aural drills, and written portions of the courses were mimetic and repetition oriented, and structure, form, syntax, and grammar were given priority status for learners. In this system there was no focus on actual language use, which led to a lack of knowledge about how language and communication work in real practice.

In the late 1970s and 80s second-language education shifted to focus on the importance of communication and language use for participation in particular discourse communities. However, emphasizing language learning as a means to enter a discourse community was also problematic, as it pressured students to surrender their own language practices in order to become practicing members of the new discourse communities.

Translanguaging as a focus of study first emerged in Bangor, Wales, in the 1980s. It is based on François Grosjean's idea that bilinguals are not two monolinguals in one. Cen Williams and his colleagues were researching strategies of using both Welsh and English in a single lesson in a classroom setting. Cen Williams' Welsh term "trawsieithu" was translated into English as "translanguaging" by their colleague Colin Baker.

Scholars argue that translanguaging functions as an emancipation from the adverse second language acquisition pedagogies of the 20th century. They believe that translanguaging gives multilingual students an advantage within educational systems because it (1) promotes a more thorough understanding of content; (2) helps the development of the weaker language for bilingual or multilingual speakers; (3) fosters home-to-school links within language use; and (4) integrates fluent speakers with early learners, thus expediting the language learning process.

Major debates 
A prominent argument against incorporating translanguaging into academic contexts is the notion that speakers of International Englishes would have difficulty communicating with one another because of the immense variety of Englishes spoken. However, advocates for translanguaging pedagogy maintain that misunderstandings between speakers of International Englishes who practice translanguaging are not common, and when misunderstandings do occur between speakers, they are quickly resolved through other means of negotiation. Advocates argue that speakers of International Englishes can communicate with relative ease because they have a variety of tools for making sense of the language varieties with which they engage.

Some academics call for the development of corpora of "nonstandard" English varieties to aid with the study of translanguaging.

Barbara Seidlhofer argues that language acquisition programs should not be teaching language with the intention of achieving native-speaker competence, but that they should be "embracing the emergent realistic goal of intercultural competence achieved through a plurilingualism that integrates rather than ostracizes" International Englishes. This pedagogical strategy necessitates translanguaging as a means through which to accomplish such plurilingualism. For Seidlhofer, the incorporation of such International Englishes into educational systems would be more beneficial for second language learners than current dominant language acquisition pedagogies, which emphasize standard American and British varieties of English. Since achieving native-speaker status is nearly impossible without years of study, translanguaging presents students with opportunities to learn language in a more supportive space, fostering their language acquisition in all varieties rather than enforcing the participation in and acquisition of a single dominant variety.

Proponents of decolonizing the English language argue that holding on to particular varieties of English as the only legitimate varieties to use in language acquisition programs is a practice that perpetuates destructive colonial attitudes towards non-English languages and the English varieties of their speakers. Incorporating translanguaging is one means through which such a decolonization of the English language could occur. In this way, decentralizing those particular dominant varieties of English would work towards legitimizing the use of "nonstandard" English varieties at the educational level.

Furthermore, Suresh Canagarajah argued that translanguaging allows students to use  and negotiate meanings by using forms of language to communicate. Therefore, he believed that the concept empowers multilingual speakers and writers to be modest, open minded, and aware of the language hegemony. Another proponent of translanguaging is April Baker Bell who argued that the African American English is a distinctive language than the American English language. In addition, she argued that allowing African American students to code-meshing would enable them not to assimilate in the white mainstream culture and would enhance their understanding to the misrepresentation of their culture and language.  Some compositionists view translanguaging is the communicative reality of global citizens and, as such, is essential to the investigative and pedagogical choices of composition scholars.

Translanguaging, code-switching and Code-meshing 
Translanguaging's relationship to the concept of code-switching depends on the model of translanguaging used. Multiple models have been created to describe the cognitive processing of language and how multilingualism functions and manifests within an individual speaker. The unitary model of translanguaging, derived from postmodernism in linguistics, considers code-switching to be a separate phenomenon from translanguaging. This is because the unitary model defines code-switching as a dual competence model, which assumes that the linguistic systems of an individual are separate without overlap. The dual competence model of code-switching directly contrasts with the post-modernist's unitary model, which theorizes that a speaker only possesses a singular linguistic system, thereby making code-switching irreconcilable with translanguaging. On the other hand, the integrated model of translanguaging takes a more centrist position. It considers code-switching to be an aspect of translanguaging alongside other multilingual activities like translation, because an individual's internal linguistic systems are thought to be overlapping but not unitary.

Linguistic postmodernists do not recognize code-switching as translanguaging because they call into question the very idea of discrete languages, arguing them to be inventions created through various cultural, political, or social processes. Postmodernists acknowledge that linguistic differences may exist between "languages", but the concept of a "language" as an abstract and independent entity is considered a social construct. When applied to translanguaging theory, postmodernists argue that an individual's linguistic competence is the sum of their individual interactions with other speakers and overall linguistic knowledge. Each person has an individually distinct linguistic repertoire, or idiolect, because of their unique socialization experience. The internal linguistic system is considered unitary and encompasses all grammatical and lexical systems. Hence, the discrete systems of linguistic competence given by code-switching cannot be considered part of translanguaging in the unitary model.

The integrated model takes a position closer to the center of the two extremes on linguistic systems. The model was developed from critiques to the unitary model, stating that the conclusions from the postmodernists were the product of theory, rather than linguistic data on multilingualism. The model posits that the internal linguistic system for any given individual is constructed with discrete lexical systems for each "language" and overlapping grammatical systems that can share phonetic, morphological, phonological, and semantic features. Linguistic systems are thought to rely on each system's linguistic structuring and whether the structuring can be done with or without cognitive differentiation. The integrated model then conceptualizes theories on code-switching to be aspects of translanguaging itself, because both the integrated model on translanguaging and code-switching assume some shared features and some distinction between cognitive linguistic systems.

The word code in either code- switching or code-meshing refers to the code of the English languages. Typically, the academy enforces the code of Standard (standardized) English, measuring prose by a single measure of grammatical and syntactical correctness in academic, public, and professional contexts. Meanwhile, other codes of English exist, codes that are raced, regionalized, and imbued with class and cultural distinctions. These nonstandard codes of English, however, such as African American English (which is also sometimes known as African American Vernacular English, Black English, or Ebonics), find themselves relegated to or deemed only appropriate in home or social contexts. In other words, the academy reinforces and reifies the notion of Standard English as the decorous language of public discourse, while other dialects—indecorous dialects—are only fit for private uses. Therefore, Code-switching can be seen as one of the defensive mechanism that marginalized communities use to assimilate in the dominant culture. For instance, African Americans tend to speak the white standard English in the classroom and in the workplace to be accepted by their white counterparts. In addition, Vershwan Ashanti Young stated that code-switching instills a separate-but-equal idea of Englishes when pedagogies teach students that they must take pains to match the correct code of English to the appropriate context, and that nonstandard Englishes, despite lip-service to their validity, are incorrect in academic, professional, and public discourse.

As a result scholars such as April Baker Bell, Vershawn Ashanti Young, and Suresh Canagrajah  advocate code-meshing as a conceptual framework to replace code-switching. Code-meshing is defined as the linguistic ability to negotiate (mesh) between two forms of language to communicate effectively; therefore, it establishes the argument that there is only one linguistic system that multilingual draw from. Daniels argues that code-switching fosters the hegemony of the standardized English or white mainstream English because it allows students to culturally and linguistically assimilate. Hence, code-meshing pedagogies attend to allow students and speakers to mesh their diversified linguistic codes with a single rhetorical context instead of dedicating one form of code to a specific context.

Translanguaging in Deaf culture 
Translanguaging in Deaf culture focuses on sensorial accessibility, as translanguaging still exists in Deaf culture; it is just different than translanguaging in non-Deaf speakers. An example of translanguaging in Deaf culture is when a "mixed deaf/hearing family communicates at the dinner table using mouthing, sign-speaking, voice, and signs." Translanguaging can be used prescriptively and descriptively and uses a speaker's entire linguistic range with disregard to the social and political sphere of languages. It also can be seen as the language practices of bilingual speakers. An ongoing issue in the Deaf community is the push for signed languages to be considered minority languages, since deaf speakers have a "sensorial inaccessibility to spoken languages." There is also an issue of access to signed languages for deaf children, as for many, this access is compromised. Deaf speakers also face sensorial asymmetries, and theories like translanguaging may threaten the political discourse for sign language rights as signed languages were seen as merely gestures fifty years ago, but not as real languages. Since deaf children use a variation of both signed and spoken languages, they share experiences similar to that of other bilingual children. Translanguaging in the Deaf community is thus unique because they use both visual and gestural, as well as spoken and written language modality.

International translanguaging 

Non-native speakers of English around the world outnumber native English speakers of English by a ratio of 3:1. With the current influx of technology and communication, English has become a heavily transnational language. As such, English varieties and International Englishes are becoming standard usage in international economic exchanges, thereby increasing their legitimacy and decreasing the dominance of the standard American and British English varieties.

Translanguaging spaces 
In the context of translanguaging, when thinking about space, it is not necessarily considered a physical space, but more of a space in the multilingual individual's mind. Through the processes of translanguaging, individuals create their own translanguaging space. Having said that, there can be many different translanguaging spaces that then get incorporated into a larger social space. For example, a university environment may provide a better translanguaging space due to the greater diversity of students in college than in a typical high school – and this is referring to the individual's life outside the classroom. Moreover, multilinguals can generate this social space where they are free to combine whichever tools they have gathered— ranging from personal history, experience and environment, attitude, belief and ideology, cognitive and physical capacity— to form a coordinated and meaningful performance. Within the translanguaging space that has been formed, the isolation of each individual language is not present. Instead, it provides an environment where all languages merge and results in completely new ideas and practices.

Multilinguals, in their translanguaging space, are continually coming up with new strategies to take advantage of their language knowledge to attain a specific communication effect in their day-to-day lives and experiences. When they become comfortable with the use of each language, creativity begins to flow, and the languages become intertwined in ways that can only be understood in that specific translanguaging space. For example, the mix of Spanish and English in Miami, Florida, leads to different translanguaging spaces. The variety among these spaces depends on the Latin country the speakers come from due to the difference in dialects that exist. It is very common to hear Spanglish being spoken in Miami but if someone speaks both Spanish and English, it does not necessarily mean the usage of certain expressions, words, and sentences will be understood.

Spanish as a second or foreign language connects translanguaging elements to facilitate understanding and a better communication process. Elements from various languages can be used to generate a more solid understanding of the ideas and make more meaning. Learners can express better answers by building knowledge from their primary language. A Bilingual education contributes to build the setting to encourage the use of trasnlanguaging as a pedagogical tool to incorporate more than one language to help learners make sense of the lesson. 

Multilingualism is a key component of the world. Recognizing the influence of cultural and linguistic elements of learning can enhance communication. Allowing space to use multiple languages to process information is critical. Learners can transfer knowledge from one language to another and build more understanding. The home language is vital in supporting other languages' learning processes. So, it cannot be seen as a separate component.

Translanguaging pedagogy 
The development of translanguaging as a part of second language acquisition pedagogy signifies an ideological shift in bilingual and multilingual education systems, wherein bilingualism and multilingualism are no longer viewed as a disadvantage to learning a second language, such as English, but rather as an asset. The incorporation of translanguaging into educational settings signifies the movement of the English language towards a more heterogeneous system of several equally valued English varieties, rather than a system of two enforced varieties (Standard American and British Englishes) contesting with several other depreciated minority varieties. Importantly, translanguaging pedagogy demands that multilingual speakers engaging in translanguaging do not vacillate between language systems arbitrarily, but rather, that they do it with intention and a metacognitive understanding of the way their language practices work.

Translanguaging promotes a deeper understanding of subject matter, by discussing in one language and writing in another. Students will always reference what they already know from their first language when working with a second language. This helps students process the information and improve communication in their second language. When introduced in a Welsh bilingual classroom, translanguaging meant that the input and output languages were often switched. In this type of setting, students are typically asked to read a text in one language and discuss it either orally or in written form in their second language. In the case of the Welsh classroom, the languages used were Welsh and English. This led to an increase of Welsh speakers in primary schools in 2007, with 36.5% of the students being able to speak Welsh, compared to 1987 when only 24.6% of students spoke Welsh.

The goal of including translanguaging as an aspect of second-language acquisition pedagogy is to move beyond sentence-level and grammatical concerns in second-language teaching strategies, and to focus more heavily on discourse issues and on the rhetoric of communication. Students should be focused on the real applications of language that suit their purposes of communication based on the context in which they are communicating, rather than a one-variety-fits-all mode of learning language. Some scholars writing within translanguaging pedagogy argue for a diversified conception of the English language, where the multiple varieties of English exist with their own norms and systems and all have equal status. Such a system will enable a variety of communities to communicate effectively in English. In this conception of English language, it should be treated as a heterogeneous global language wherein standard varieties of English such as Indian English, Nigerian English, and Trinidadian English would still have the same status as the orthodox varieties of British and American English. Reinforcing only one variety of English in academic situations is disadvantageous for students, since students will ultimately encounter many varied communicative contexts, and as society becomes more digitally advanced, many of those communicative contexts will be transnational.

Since translanguaging is not yet a widely sanctioned language practice in educational systems, it is often practiced by students in secret and kept hidden from instructors. The practice of natural translanguaging without the presence of direct pedagogical effort can lead to issues of competence and transfer in academic contexts for students. This issue is why academics call for the inclusion of translanguaging in language acquisition programs, since students need to practice their translanguaging in a semi-structured environment in order to acquire competence and proficiency in communicating across academic contexts. If they are given the appropriate context in which to practice, students can integrate dominant writing conventions into their language practices and negotiate critically between language systems as they engage in translanguaging. For students to be successful at translanguaging in academic and other varied contexts, they must exercise critical metacognitive awareness about their language practices.

Teachers 
Making use of translanguaging in the classroom does not require the teacher to be bilingual; however, it does require the teacher to be a co-learner. Monolingual teachers working with bilingual or multilingual students can successfully use this teaching practice; however, they must rely on the students, their parents, the community, texts, and technology more than the bilingual teacher, in order to support the learning and leverage the students' existing resources. As translanguaging allows the legitimization of all varieties, teachers can participate by being open to learning the varieties of their students, and by incorporating words from unfamiliar languages into their own use, serving as a model for their students to begin working with their non-native languages.

The traditional prohibition of translanguaging in high-stakes writing assignments can prevent multilingual students from practicing their translanguaging abilities, and so it is the responsibility of the instructor to provide safe spaces for students to practice and develop their translanguaging skills. Teachers must plan out the translanguaging practices to be used with their students just as each lesson must be planned out, as translanguaging is not random. By reading bilingual authors and texts, teachers give the students the chance to experience two or more languages together and help compare and contrast the languages for the children.

Importantly, the use of translanguaging in the classroom enables language acquisition for the students without the direct insertion or influence of the teacher. While teachers do not need to become a compendium of the languages or language varieties practiced in their classrooms, they do need to be open to working with these new languages and language varieties to encourage student participation in translanguaging.

Language immersion programs can implement translanguaging as a technique to transform language learning. Educators can incorporate students' previous knowledge to encourage students to collaborate and make connections. Simultaneously, translanguaging can be implemented at home to allow students from multilingual families to connect words from another language to communicate better. Learners' First language is a fundamental part of learning a second language. The structure of the first language can create meaning in the grammar and spelling of the second language. Learners can connect to the linguistic elements since they already know the word's meaning.

Higher education 
Many students will use translanguaging in higher education where they are attending a university that does not have their first language as the medium of instruction. The students use their multiple languages as resources in their learning and understanding of subjects and ideas. An environment of multiple languages spoken with various repertoires allows a greater multilingual competence of subjects taught and reviewed in each language available. Bilingual or multilingual students in higher education who study in their native tongue and the medium of instruction used at their institutions are studied to determine how to reform primary and secondary education. This creates room for discussion of primary and secondary school systems and their language(s) of instruction. Translanguaging in higher education has been seen mostly within North America and in the United Kingdom. There are certain countries that are accepting of multilingual policies, such as India. However, places such as the United Arab Emirates are not accepting of adopting languages into their school systems.

Multiple languages and translanguaging 
Languages can connect to each other in many ways. Therefore, understanding the grammatical structure, pronunciation, roots can be very similar in many languages, making them easy to understand when compared to each other. Translanguaging is a learning strategy that can enhance lexical skills. Learners can compare and contrast the grammatical structure and sounds of each language to build understanding of the new one. For examples some cognates can support comprehension and morphological understanding.

For example:

English / Spanish

solid-sólido

liquid-líquido

gas-gaseoso

Translanguaging and collaborative translation 

Using the first language to support the second language can benefit in numerous ways.  Learners can connect their previous knowledge to their new learning. Additionally, technology can support the development and comprehension of multiple languages based on learning theories and strategies. This can also facilitate the visualization and interaction with grammar, pronunciation, and much of various languages simultaneously. According to Ofelia Garcia, translanguaging can contribute to education by:

Collaborative translation can also contribute to translanguaging because many participants can translate simultaneously in the same document. This technique is fundamental because learners can utilize all the language knowledge, they have from their first, second or third language to input and expand knowledge in several areas.

Cultural component 
Translanguaging allows learners to connect the information they already know to the new information. In a learning environment, learners should be able to use previous knowledge to build more structure and connections to what they already know. The implementation of translanguaging also preserves cultural heritage. Learners can transfer ways in which languages are similar to support understanding of one another and preserve their first language. Language is part of the Intangible cultural heritage that learners can maintain by using one language to make sense of the other.

Literature 
There is a burgeoning body of latino literature that features translanguaging acts as cultural markers and as aesthetic devices, including literary fiction and children's books. Immigrant and second generation American authors feature translanguaging in their storyworlds, including Giannina Braschi, Susana Chavez-Silverman, and Junot Díaz. Braschi's translingual novel Yo-Yo Boing! (1998) offers many examples of translanguaging, code-switching, and liquidity, as well as Puerto Rican and Nuyorican dialectalisms (dar pon, vejigantes, chinas; ¡Ay, bendito!), all of which express a literary language and cultural markers. Yo-Yo Boing! demonstrates a metalinguistic awareness of translanguaging and the space between languages. The narrator states that “somos bilingües” (when she speaks of “barreras lingüísticas") and resorts to pseudo phonetic writing to represent colloquialisms, in Spanish or English.

See also
Linguistic imperialism
Raciolinguistics
Translingualism
Multilingualism
Spanglish

References

External links
 

Bilingualism
Code-switching
Sociolinguistics